San Javier Airport  is an airport serving San Javier in the Santa Cruz Department of Bolivia.

See also

Transport in Bolivia
List of airports in Bolivia

References

External links 
OpenStreetMap - San Javier
OurAirports - San Javier
SkyVector - San Javier
Fallingrain - San Javier Airport

Airports in Santa Cruz Department (Bolivia)